Liliana Leonidovna Gasinskaya (Liliana Leonidivna Hasynska) is a woman who defected from the Soviet Union in 1979. On board a Soviet cruise ship, SS Leonid Sobinov (Black Sea Shipping Company), in Sydney Harbour, Gasinskaya slipped out of a porthole wearing only a red bikini (earning her the nickname "The Girl in the Red Bikini").

A debate ensued over whether then Immigration Minister Michael MacKellar should grant Gasinskaya asylum or deport her, as was customary for other ship deserters. Despite her unspecified claims of repression, which one commentator sneered may have been "the shops in Russia are boring", she was allowed to remain.

She later earned $15,000 as the first nude centerfold in Australia's edition of Penthouse magazine.

References

External links
 Eduard Anriushchenko. A girl in red bikini. Declassified KGB case (Дівчина в червоному бікіні. Розсекречена справа КГБ). Istorychna Pravda (Ukrayinska Pravda). 10 December 2020.

1960 births
Living people
People from Alchevsk
Komsomol
Refugees in Australia
Soviet emigrants to Australia
Soviet escapees